The County Hall is a municipal building located beside the disused Bute East Dock in the Atlantic Wharf area of Butetown, Cardiff. Formerly the home of South Glamorgan County Council, it is now the headquarters of Cardiff Council.

History

Design and construction

Following the implementation of the Local Government Act 1972, which broke up Glamorgan County Council and established South Glamorgan County Council, the new county council was initially headquartered in a building on Newport Road, Cardiff. After finding this arrangement inadequate for their needs, the new county leaders decided to procure a purpose-built county hall: the site they selected was derelict land on the west side of Bute East Dock.

The building was designed by J. R. C. Bethell, the County Architect for South Glamorgan, and built between 1986 and 1987. This was at a time when the surrounding area consisted mainly of post-industrial dereliction. Hence the construction of the new building has been described in Buildings of Wales: Glamorgan as a "remarkable gesture of faith [by] the South Glamorgan County Council". It is seen as representative of a new form of civic building that does not dominate its surroundings by its size, or formal language, to the extent that it could "even [be] a deliberate abregation of the arrogant assertiveness of the late C19, expressed across the water". It was officially opened by Lord Callaghan in October 1988.

Development
On 1 April 1996, under the Local Government (Wales) Act 1994, South Glamorgan County Council was broken up and Cardiff Council became the local authority in the area and took over County Hall. In September 2007, former Council chief executive Byron Davies unveiled plans aimed at large efficiency improvements and bringing in additional funding, which could include selling County Hall, the Cardiff Heliport and up to 40% of Cardiff Bus. In 2013 the potential sale and demolition of County Hall was again raised, as part of Cardiff Council's plans to reduce their property commitments. It was suggested an indoor arena and convention centre could be built on the site.

Architecture
County Hall is generally three storeys in height, but rises to four and five storeys in places. The distinctive shallow pitch roofs are of black slate. In plan the building is formed around a central courtyard.
It is the main headquarters of Cardiff Council and is home to many of the council's departments. Internally, the principal rooms are the council chamber and committee rooms.

The Cardiff Council Camera Control Room is also located at County Hall, where operators use CCTV to monitor locations across the city in an attempt to stop fly-tipping and other criminal activity. County Hall is also marketed as a venue for conferences, weddings and other events. It boasts an in-house catering team, a large bar for refreshments and function suites to accommodate up to 300 people.

References

External links 
Cardiff County Council
Cardiff County Hall website

Buildings and structures in Cardiff
Politics of Cardiff
County halls in Wales
South Glamorgan
Government buildings completed in 1987